Leste Potiguar is a mesoregion in the Brazilian state of Rio Grande do Norte.

Microregions
 Litoral Nordeste
 Litoral Sul
 Macaíba
 Natal

Mesoregions of Rio Grande do Norte